Naseem Shah may refer to:
 Naseem Shah (cricketer), Pakistani international cricketer
 Nasim Hasan Shah, Pakistani jurist
 Naz Shah, British politician